San Policarpo all'Acquedotto Claudio is a parochial church in Rome and titular church for a Cardinal-Priest. 

It is named for the Aqua Claudia aqueduct nearby, and for Polycarp, a 2nd-century AD saint and writer.

Parish church 
The church was built in 1967 for a parish which was created in 1960, in East Rome's XXth prefecture. It is located on Piazza Aruleno Celio Sabino 50, Roma, Roma, Lazio 00174 at the Via Lemonia.

Pope John Paul II visited the church twice, on 2 May 1982 and 11 March 1990.

On 14 February 2015, it was made a titular church to be held by a Cardinal-Priest.

List
 Alberto Suárez Inda (2015.02.14 – present)

References

External links
 GCatholic the cardinal title 
 GCatholic the parochial church 
 parochial website (Italian)

Titular churches
Churches in Rome Q. XXV Appio Claudio
Roman Catholic churches completed in 1967
20th-century Roman Catholic church buildings in Italy